Temple Beth Israel is a historic Jewish synagogue building at 21 Charter Oak Avenue in Hartford, Connecticut.   Built in 1875-76, it is the oldest purpose-built synagogue building in the state.  The building was listed on the National Register of Historic Places in 1978.  After being rescued from threatened demolition, it now houses a local cultural center.  The congregation, established in 1843, is now located at a synagogue in West Hartford.

Description and history
The former Temple Beth Israel building is located south of downtown Hartford in the Sheldon-Charter Oak neighborhood.  It is on the south side of Charter Oak Avenue, just east its junction with Main Street and west of Charter Oak Park. It is a 2-1/2 story brick structure with a brownstone foundation and stone trim. It has a gabled roof, flanked at the front by towers with octagonal domed tops.  Windows and entrances are set in round-arch openings in the Romanesque style.

The synagogue was designed by George Keller and built in 1875-76 for a Jewish congregation established in 1843.  It was in 1843 that the state, at the instigation of the congregation's leadership, passed a law making it possible for Jewish congregations to build synagogues.  It is the only known High Victorian Romanesque work of Keller, who was one of Hartford's leading architects of the second half of the 20th century.  The temple was used by that congregation until 1935, when it was sold to the Calvary Temple congregation, which occupied it until 1974.  After standing vacant for some years, the city threatened to demolish it.  Jewish groups around the state organized to preserve it, and it now houses the Charter Oak Cultural Center.

See also
National Register of Historic Places listings in Hartford, Connecticut

References

Synagogues in Connecticut
Synagogues on the National Register of Historic Places in Connecticut
Synagogues completed in 1875
Buildings and structures in Hartford, Connecticut
George Keller buildings
National Register of Historic Places in Hartford, Connecticut
1875 establishments in Connecticut
Moorish Revival synagogues
Moorish Revival architecture in Connecticut